Agusta Edda Bjornsdóttir (born 15 March 1977) is an Icelandic road racing cyclist. She became national time trial champion in 2017, 2019 and 2020; and national road race champion in 2019 and 2020. She represented Iceland in the women’s time trial and women’s road race at the 2019 UCI Road World Championships and 2020 UCI Road World Championships. At the 2020 championships she was 43 years old.

Major results
2016 
1st  Cyclo-cross, National Cyclo-cross Championships

2017 
National Road Championships
1st  Time Trial
3rd Road Race
2nd Glacier 360 Mountainbike

2018 
National Road Championships
1st  Road Race
2nd Time Trial
1st  Cyclo-cross, National Cyclo-cross Championships

2019 
National Road Championships
1st  Road Race
1st  Time Trial

2020 
National Road Championships
1st  Road Race
1st  Time Trial

References

1977 births
Living people
Icelandic female cyclists
Place of birth missing (living people)
20th-century Icelandic women
21st-century Icelandic women